Start Cheering is a 1938 American musical film directed by Albert S. Rogell and starring Jimmy Durante, Charles Starrett, Joan Perry, and Walter Connolly. It is best remembered today for guest appearances throughout the film by The Three Stooges (Curly Howard, Moe Howard, and Larry Fine), who were Columbia Pictures' short subject headliners at the time, as campus firemen. The film's choreography was by Danny Dare.

Premise
Film star Ted Crosley (Charles Starrett) is fed up with Hollywood and quits the movies to enroll in college under an assumed name. While Ted struggles to fit in on campus and tries out for the football team, his frustrated manager Sam Lewis (Walter Connolly) and Lewis's sidekick Willie Gumbatz (Jimmy Durante) try to have him expelled from the college so he can resume his Hollywood career. Radio's Professor Quiz (Craig E. Earle) is teaching a special course on campus, giving Lewis the idea to promote Crosley's campus activities on network radio. Bandleader Johnny Green is also on campus, lending musical accompaniment to the many songs.

Production
Production began in October 1937 under the title Freshman Follies. One of the original songs, "Start Cheering," became the new film title. Many members of Columbia's stock company played incidental roles, and some of them appear twice in different roles and costumes.

Charles Starrett was established as Columbia's cowboy star, and petitioned his employers to cast him in modern-day stories. Start Cheering was Starrett's only opportunity along these lines; Columbia returned him to westerns, and he remained with Columbia until his retirement in 1952.

The ingenue in Start Cheering, Joan Perry, made such an impression on Columbia president Harry Cohn that he proposed marriage to her. They were wed until Cohn's death in 1958.

Specialty performer Chaz Chase does his vaudeville act periodically during the film: he eats everything on his person: pages from books, flowers, buttons, etc.

Cast 
 Jimmy Durante as Willie Gumbatz
 Charles Starrett as Ted Crosley
 Joan Perry as Jean Worthington
 Walter Connolly as Sam Lewis
 Craig E. Earle as Professor Quiz (billed as Professor Quiz)
 Gertrude Niesen as Sarah
 Raymond Walburn as Dean Worthington
 Broderick Crawford as Biff Gordon
 The Three Stooges as themselves
 Hal Le Roy as Tarzan Biddle, quiz contestant and dancer
 Ernest Truex as Blodgett, Crosley's butler
 Johnny Green as himself, bandleader
 Chaz Chase as Shorty
 Vernon Dent as Empire Studios executive and soda jerk Pops
 Gene Morgan as Coach Burns
 Arthur Hoyt as librarian
 Claire Rochelle as student
 Edward LeSaint as first board overseer
 Lew Davis as team doctor and candy butcher
 Minerva Urecal as Miss Grimley, dean of women
 Lucille Lund as Flossie
 Eddie Fetherston as man at water fountain and man setting up microphone
 Jane Hamilton as student
 Claire Rochelle as student
 Robert Paige (singing voice for Charles Starrett)

See also 
 List of American films of 1938
 The Three Stooges filmography

References

External links 
 
 
 

1938 films
1938 musical comedy films
1938 romantic comedy films
American musical comedy films
American romantic comedy films
American romantic musical films
American black-and-white films
Columbia Pictures films
1930s English-language films
Films about actors
Films about the education system in the United States
Films directed by Albert S. Rogell
Films set in universities and colleges
The Three Stooges films
1930s romantic musical films
1930s American films